Parvathagiri is a village and a mandal in Warangal district in the state of Telangana in India.

Villages 

 Annaram Sharif 
 Burugamadla 
 Chinta Nekkonda 
 Choutapalle 
 Enugal 
 Gopanapalle 
 Kalleda 
 Konkapaka 
 Parvathagiri 
 Ravoor 
 Rollakal 
 Somaram 
 Vadlakonda 
 Narayanapuram
 Doulthnagar

References 

Villages in Warangal district
Mandals in Warangal district